The Asian or Asiatic ostrich (Struthio asiaticus), is an extinct species of ostrich that lived during the Neogene period on the Indian subcontinent.

Discovery 
The early records that ranged from the Pliocene Epoch in Africa to the Pleistocene-Holocene Epoch in northeastern Asia are considered dubious. Beads made from shells taken from archaeological sites in India dating to more than 25,000 years were found to have traces of DNA and analysis of sequences examined from them show that the species is definitely in the genus Struthio.

Description 

Asian ostriches were large, being more robustly built and reaching about the same height as an adult male of the extant common ostrich. It may have had short toes, but this is considered a tentative assumption. A specimen from the Pliocene of Morocco could be 20% bigger than an adult male of the extant Struthio camelus, but the African specimens are considered dubious, and the "exact proportions are difficult to reconstruct on the basis of the available material."

References

Works cited

Additional reading
 
Routledge, Jennifer (2020). "Ostrich Eggshell from the Far Eastern Steppe: Stable Isotopic Exploration of Range, Commodification, and Extirpation". ProQuest Dissertations Publishing, 2020

Ostriches
Extinct flightless birds
Ratites
Struthio
Late Quaternary prehistoric birds
Neogene birds of Asia
Pleistocene birds
Zanclean first appearances
Holocene extinctions
Extinct birds of Asia
Quaternary birds of Asia
Fossil taxa described in 1871